The Rural Municipality of Antler No. 61 is a rural municipality (RM) in the Canadian province of Saskatchewan within Census Division No. 1 and  Division No. 1.

History 
The RM of Antler No. 61 incorporated as a rural municipality on December 13, 1909.

Geography

Communities and localities 
The following urban municipalities are surrounded by the RM.

Towns
Redvers

The following unincorporated communities are within the RM.

Special service areas
Antler

Localities
Fry's
Wauchope

Demographics 

Government 
The RM of Antler No. 61 is governed by an elected municipal council and an appointed administrator that meets on the second Tuesday of every month. The reeve of the RM is Bernard Bauche while its administrator is Melissa Roberts. The RM's office is located in Redvers.

Transportation 
Rail
Souris - Arcola - Regina Section C.P.R—serves Reston, Sinclair, Antler, Frys, Wauchope, Manor, Carlyle, Arcola, Kisbey, Forget, Stoughton

Roads
Highway 13—serves Redvers
Highway 600—continues east from Highway 13 to Manitoba -Saskatchewan border
Highway 8—serves Redvers
Highway 601—North south Highway section west of Redvers

See also 
List of rural municipalities in Saskatchewan

References 

A
Division No. 1, Saskatchewan